Butler railway station (officially Butler Station) is a commuter railway station in Butler, Western Australia, a suburb of Perth. It is the terminus of the Joondalup line, which is on the Transperth commuter rail network. Planning for the Joondalup line in the Butler area began in the late 1990s. The station was built as part of a $240 million extension of the Joondalup line from Clarkson to Butler. Construction began on the station on 16 July 2012, and was completed on 16 May 2014, opening on 21 September 2014. The Joondalup line is currently being extended past Butler station to Yanchep railway station. As of November 2021, the extension is planned to open at the end of 2023.

Butler station has two side platforms situated in a cutting below the surrounding ground level. It is accessed from a ground-level concourse. Services run every 10 minutes during peak and every 15 minutes between peak. The station is served by six regular bus routes, operated by Swan Transit under contract. To the south, these bus routes link to Clarkson station, traversing through several suburbs along the way. To the north, these bus routes go as far as Two Rocks, on the northern edge of the Perth metropolitan region.

Description

Butler railway station is in Butler, a suburb of Perth, Western Australia. It is located east of Exmouth Drive and north of Butler Boulevard. The next station to the south is Clarkson station.

The station consists of two side platforms situated in a cutting below ground level. At ground level is a concourse which can be used to cross over the railway or access the station. Operating hours are from approximately 5 am to 1 am, extending to 2 am on Friday and Saturday nights. Outside station operating hours, the concourse is locked. Each platform is served by an escalator, a lift, and a set of stairs, making it fully accessible. On the concourse are toilets, a kiosk, a customer service office and fare gates. It has 891 car parking bays. The station, designed by Coniglio Ainsworth Architects, received a commendation at the 2015 WA Architecture Awards.

The artwork consists of 1,200 aluminium rods with various lengths. Each rod has a brightly coloured end, with the colour depending on the height of the aluminium rod; shorter rods being on the blue end of the spectrum, and longer rods being on the red end of the spectrum. The artwork represents the ripples from raindrops falling on water, with mathematical modelling used to determine the height of each rod to make the piece of art look like a realistic wave.

History
The original stage of the Joondalup line began construction in November 1989. It was opened between Perth station and Joondalup station on 20 December 1992, and extended to Currambine railway station on 8 August 1993. An extension to Clarkson station opened on 4 October 2004.

Planning and construction
During planning for the Joondalup line extension from Currambine station to Clarkson station in the late 1990s and early 2000s, it was recognised that the Joondalup line would be eventually extended north of Clarkson. Two potential stations were recognised: a park-and-ride station at Lukin Drive, called Butler station; and a station north of that, surrounded by a transit oriented development, called Brighton station. The name "Brighton" is a commonly used, but unofficial name for part of Butler. $2.1 million was allocated in the 2007 state budget for planning the extension to Butler.

Before the 2008 Western Australian state election, both the Labor and Liberal parties promised to extend the Joondalup line to Butler. After the Liberal Party formed government following the election, Transport Minister Simon O'Brien said in 2009 that it was hoped that construction would start in 2011–12, and the extension would open in 2014. At the time, the number of stations on the extension was not decided.

In November 2009, the government introduced the Railway (Butler to Brighton) Bill into Parliament. The opposition criticised the plan to not build the station at Lukin Drive. O'Brien defended the choice of building only one station, saying that the Public Transport Authority told him it was a better idea to do so. The plan called for Brighton station to be a park and ride station, as the previously planned station at Lukin Drive was not going to be built. At this time, preliminary earthworks had begun. The bill passed in July 2010.

The first of the main contracts for the project was awarded to R J Vincent & Co in December 2010. The earthworks for double tracks had already been completed during the construction of a single track between Clarkson station and Nowergup depot. The next major contract was awarded on 20 May 2011 to a joint venture between Bocol Constructions and R J Vincent & Co. The $9.8 million contract was for the construction of bridges across the railway corridor and associated roadworks. The bridges were at Butler Boulevard, Landbeach Boulevard and Benendin Avenue. Bocal constructed the bridges and concrete walls; R J Vincent did the road construction, earthworks, traffic management, and everything else not under Bocal's scope. The station design was approved by a Joint Development Assessment Panel on 5 December 2011. A $22 million contract for the construction of Butler station was awarded to Cooper and Oxley in July 2012, and construction on the station began on 16 July 2012.

By October 2012, earthworks and the construction of the three bridges was complete. The single track between Clarkson station and Nowergup depot was duplicated, and double track was constructed between Nowergup depot and Butler station. In November 2012, a $19.7 million contract was signed with Ansaldo STS Australia to design and construct the railway signalling system for the extension. Included in the funding for the project were four new Transperth B-series trains and 11 new buses. The construction of the station was completed on 16 May 2014. Over the following months, works on the tracks, signalling and overhead electrical systems continued.

Commissioning and opening

The first train ran on the extension on 25 August 2014, with train driver familiarisation beginning after that. The station was opened on 21 September 2014 by Premier Colin Barnett and Minister for Transport Dean Nalder, several months early and $20 million under budget.

Some nearby residents experienced excessive vibrations when trains passed their homes. 178 people signed a petition saying that they and their homes were "severely and adversely impacted" by vibrations from trains.  of acoustic matting was used for the extension, but it was not used for the tracks closest to Butler station, where the complaints were coming from. Nalder said that computer modelling was used to determine where to place the acoustic matting, based on ground conditions, geography and track geometry. He also said that the PTA would monitor noise and vibrations over the coming months. On 12 October 2014, 50 residents gathered around the railway line to protest against the vibrations. Opposition leader Mark McGowan, Member for Butler John Quigley and Shadow Transport Minister Ken Travers attended the protest as well. Nalder reiterated that the government was undertaking vibration monitoring. In December 2014, the results on noise monitoring were released. The monitoring found that noise and vibration levels near Butler station were within acceptable standards, but noise and vibrations were above acceptable levels at Kilkee Street, near Nowergup depot. The PTA said that a larger earth noise wall would be built there.

Before opening, the projected patronage for the station was 2,000 people per day. The station reached that patronage nine days after opening. In August 2015, the station had 2,022 daily boardings, with a total of 600,000 in its first year of operation. Boardings on buses in the surrounding area were also up by 13% compared to before the station opened.

Railway extension north of Butler

In late 2019, construction started on extending the Joondalup line north , with three stations on the extension. The next station from Butler will be Alkimos railway station. The platforms at Butler station will be extended. As of November 2021, the extension is planned to be open late 2023.

Services

Butler station is served by the Joondalup line on the Transperth network. Services are operated by Transperth Train Operations. The line goes between Butler and Elizabeth Quay railway station in the Perth central business district, continuing south from there as the Mandurah line. As the station is a terminus, both platforms are used for services towards Elizabeth Quay. Joondalup line trains depart the station every 10 minutes during peak on weekdays, and every 15 minutes outside peak, and on weekends and public holidays. Christmas Day has a different timetable to other public holidays. At night time, trains are half-hourly or hourly.

Butler station has a bus interchange with six bus stands. Bus services are operated by Swan Transit under contract. Six regular bus routes serve the station. Routes 480, 482, 483 and 484 link to Clarkson railway station, passing through suburbs including Clarkson, Jindalee, Merriwa, Mindarie, Quinns Rocks and Ridgewood. Routes 483 and 484 also go just north of the station to Alkimos. Routes 490 and 491 go north of the station, passing through Alkimos and Eglinton to get to Yanchep and Two Rocks, which is the northernmost suburb of the Perth metropolitan region. Route 491 was introduced alongside the new station; the other routes already existed, but were rerouted when the station opened. Rail replacement bus services operate as route 904.

References

External links

Butler Station information page from Transperth

Joondalup line
Railway stations in Perth, Western Australia
Railway stations in Australia opened in 2014
Bus stations in Perth, Western Australia